Angelo Piccaluga (6 October 1906 – 7 March 1993) was an Italian footballer, who played as a forward for Pro Vercelli, Modena F.C., U.S. Palermo, A.S. Biellese 1902, and the Italy national football team.

He played 2 matches for Italy being part of the successful 1927-30 Central European International Cup campaign.

International 
Italy
 Central European International Cup: 1927-30

References

Italian footballers
Italy international footballers
1906 births
1993 deaths
People from Vercelli
Association football forwards
F.C. Pro Vercelli 1892 players
Modena F.C. players
Palermo F.C. players
Casale F.B.C. managers
Italian football managers
A.S.D. La Biellese players